The Wichita State Shockers football program was a college football team that represented Wichita State University until the school discontinued football.  The team had 32 head coaches since its first recorded football game in 1897. The last head coach for the team was Ron Chismar who first took the position for the 1984 season.

Key

Coaches

See also

 List of Wichita State University people

Notes

References

Lists of college football head coaches

Kansas sports-related lists